Ramariopsis is a genus of coral fungi in the family Clavariaceae. The genus has a collectively widespread distribution and contains about 40 species. The name means 'having the appearance of Ramaria'''.

TaxonomyRamariopsis was originally defined as a subgenus of Clavaria by Dutch mycologist Marinus Anton Donk in 1933. Several European species similar to the type, Clavaria kunzei, were included: Clavaria subtilis, Clavaria pyxidata, Clavaria angulispora, and Clavaria pulchella. In Donk's concept, defining characteristics of the group included small, branching, fruitbodies with a stipe, and an almost cartilaginous consistency to the flesh. Spores are small and hyaline (translucent), spherical to ellipsoid, and have a surface ornamentation ranging from echinulate (spiny) to verruculose (covered with small warts). E.J.H. Corner promoted the subgenus to generic status in his 1950 world monograph of clavarioid fungi.

Ron Petersen emended the genus in 1966 to include smooth-spored species, such as R. minutula. Three years later, he proposed the subgenus Laevispora to contain the smooth-spored species. In 1985, Pegler and Young used electron microscopy to examine the ultrastructural details of the spore surface, which revealed that the spores considered smooth with conventional light microscopy were ornamented at the ultrastructural level. They determined that the genus could be divided into three groups based on spore ornamentation. The Kunzei group have a discontinuous tunica (sheath) that form verrucae (warts); the Biformis group have a continuous tunica that form verrucae; and the Minutula group have a continuous tunica that form rugosities (wrinkles or creases).

Description
Species have upright fruit bodies that are stalked, with several branches, often dichotomously, sometimes antler-like. The branches can be cylindrical or flattened, with a pointed or rounded apex, and the texture of the flesh can be brittle or fairly tough, and in various colours. Hyphae are more or less swollen, with clamps.  The basidia are mostly four-spored.  Spores are broadly ellipsoid or roughly spherical, with a maximum length of 5.5 μm. They are hyaline, finely echinulate or warted, and each contains a large oil-drop or guttule.

DistributionRamariopsis species are widely distributed in semi-evergreen to wet evergreen shola forests of the Western Ghats, Kerala, India and occur scattered in dense clumps on soil and rarely on rotten wood. Two species, viz. Ramariopsis kunzei and R. pulchella have been reported from the Western Ghats.

Species

, Index Fungorum include 36 valid species in Ramariopsis. Petersen described over a dozen new species from New Zealand in 1988.R. agglutinata R.H.Petersen 1988 – New ZealandR. alutacea R.H.Petersen 1988 – New ZealandR. asperulospora (G.F.Atk.) Corner 1950R. asterella (G.F.Atk.) Corner 1950R. aurantioolivacea R.H.Petersen 1988 – New ZealandR. avellanea  R.H.Petersen 1988 – New ZealandR. avellaneo-inversa R.H.Petersen 1988 – New ZealandR. bicolor R.H.Petersen 1988 – New ZealandR. biformis (G.F.Atk.) R.H.Petersen 1964R. californica R.H.Petersen 1969R. cinnamomipes R.H.Petersen 1978R. citrina Schild 1971R. clavuligera (R.Heim) Corner 1950R. costaricensis L.D.Gómez 1972R. cremicolor R.H.Petersen 1988 – New ZealandR. crocea (Pers.) Corner 1950R. dealbata (Berk.) R.H.Petersen 1984R. flavescens R.H.Petersen 1969R. hibernica Corner 1971R. holmskjoldii (Oudem.) R.H.Petersen 1978R. junquillea R.H.Petersen 1988 – New ZealandR. kunzei  (Fr.) Corner 1950R. longipes R.H.Petersen 1988 – New ZealandR. luteotenerrima (Overeem) R.H.Petersen 1988 – New ZealandR. minutula (Bourdot & Galzin) R.H.Petersen 1966R. novae-hibernica Corner 1971R. ovispora R.H.Petersen 1988 – New ZealandR. pseudosubtilis R.H.Petersen 1969R. pulchella (Boud.) Corner 1950R. ramarioides R.H.Petersen 1988 – New ZealandR. simplex R.H.Petersen 1988 – New ZealandR. subtilis (Pers.) R.H.Petersen 1978R. tenuicula (Bourdot & Galzin) R.H.Petersen 1969R. tenuiramosa Corner 1950R. tortuosa R.H.Petersen 1988 – New ZealandR. vestitipes'' (Peck) Corner 1950

See also
List of Agaricales genera

References

External links

Clavariaceae
Agaricales genera
Taxa named by Marinus Anton Donk